Matthew James Vandrau (born 22 July 1969) is a retired English-born South African-raised cricketer. Having moved to South Africa at an early age, he first appeared in first-class cricket playing for Transvaal in 1990. He moved to England in 1993 to play for Derbyshire in two stints between 1993 and 1997.

These were separated by Transvaal's entry into the UCB Bowl, a competition in which Vandrau participated yearly between 1994, when his Transvaal team shared the trophy with Western Province after a draw, despite Vandrau's absence from the team, and 1995, when they did not progress beyond the group stage.

He continued to play first-class cricket until 1997, at which point he was not offered a new contract.

Now Vandrau is based in London with his family.

1969 births
English cricketers
Living people
Derbyshire cricketers
Gauteng cricketers